Cockpit iPads are iPads used in the aviation industry as part of an electronic flight bag to replace paper charts and manuals. This technology is currently being used by both private and commercial aircraft pilots.

History and testing 
The iPad has been used in general aviation in conjunction with its paper backup counterpart, which is mandated by the Federal Aviation Administration (FAA). There are many applications available which include everything that would be on the paper charts plus aviation tools including navigation charts, taxi procedures, weather maps, GPS, Minimum Equipment List, Company Policy Manual, Federal Aviation Regulations and flight controls. Although these tools have been used in the private sector, the use of an iPad in commercial aviation is just taking flight.

The Federal Aviation Administration finished a three-month testing project which included putting the device through adverse conditions such as rapid decompression testing and tests to make sure the tablet did not interfere with the avionic equipment. Early in 2011 the FAA authorized charter company Executive Jet Management to use iPad records without the backup paper charts.  This helps to make way for the iPad to become an aviation instrument for the rest of the industry.  Alaska Airlines, Delta Air Lines, and American Airlines planned test programs.

Practicality 
The main motive to use the iPad as a navigation tool is the practicality of the product. Major airlines based in the United States are mainly paper based, which includes some who have fleets of 900 plus planes. This translates to a lot of paper in the form of charts that could be saved by the iPad. The switch to an electronic system would also make life easier on the pilot. No longer would pilots carry around a heavy flight bag. It would be replaced by the 9.5 by 7.31-inch  tablet. When used in conjunction with a specially designed strap, this small size allows them to be used in place of kneeboards. Flight planning is also made easier by the iPad. The pilot would be able to use one device to check everything from weather, other airport facilities and flight plans. All this makes a pilot's life a lot easier.

Safety 
The iPad brings several safety advantages into the cockpit.  First is the currency and completeness of the charts. Paper chart revisions are issued every two weeks. A pilot can easily misfile a paper chart, remove the wrong one or forget to file the chart altogether by the time of the flight occurs.  An outdated or misplaced chart can increase the possibility of accidents.

Secondly, carrying the 40+ pound kitbag that holds all of the navigation charts is a cause of personal injuries of the pilots themselves.  According to Patrick O’Keeffe, American Airlines’s vice president of Airline Operations Technology, “[American Airlines has] reduced the single biggest source of pilot injuries: carrying those packs.”

The iPad also allows for a decrease of clutter in the cockpit. This leads to a safer flight for the pilot and passengers. Pilots need not spread out the large charts in the small cockpit, hence they don't obstruct the view.  Pilots can quickly swipe their fingers around the chart as well as switch charts in matter of seconds. This give pilots more time to look out the cockpit window and allows them to be able to just take a glance instead of searching around on a map.

A number of potential issues have been brought up including distractions in the cockpit, but the iPads are prohibited from being used for non-flight purposes and pilots are still using onboard GPS instruments. Other potential safety issues included application failure and system failure, but in the three-month test Executive Jet Management conducted, not once did the application shut off or have a failure.  Tests did show that if a failure did take place the program could reboot in four to six seconds. Extra iPads in the cockpit are also being talked about as a backup to a system failure. Airlines are also looking into the safety of the placement of the iPads in the cockpit. The most popular placement is on a pilot's kneeboard, a strap that connects to the pilot's upper thigh and makes the device hands free, but many commercial airlines are looking into a dock that is connected to the plane itself.

References 

IPad
Avionics